Gateway is an elevated station on the Expo Line of Metro Vancouver's SkyTrain rapid transit system. The station is located at the intersection of 108 Avenue and University Drive in the Surrey City Centre district of Surrey, British Columbia, Canada. Connections to bus routes servicing Guildford and Newton town centres can be made at this station.

History
Gateway station was built in 1994 as part of the second extension of the original SkyTrain system (now known as the Expo Line). This extension was built to serve Surrey City Centre and included three stations; Gateway, Surrey Central and King George stations, the latter being the terminus of the Expo Line branch to Surrey.

Station information

Station layout

Entrances
Gateway station is served by two entrances. The west entrance is located adjacent to University Drive and is an elevator-only entrance that provides access for the disabled. The second entrance is located on the east along 108 Avenue and is next to Station Tower.

Transit connections

Bus bay assignments are as follows:

References

Expo Line (SkyTrain) stations
Railway stations in Canada opened in 1994
Buildings and structures in Surrey, British Columbia
Transport in Surrey, British Columbia
1994 establishments in British Columbia